Rethink may refer to:

Rethink (record label), American record label
Rethink Communications, Canadian advertising agency
Rethink Mental Illness, British mental health charity
Rethink Robotics, American robotics company